Leonard of Noblac (also Leonard of Limoges or Leonard of Noblet; also known as Lienard, Linhart, Leonhard, Léonard, Leonardo, Annard; died 559), is a Frankish saint closely associated with the town and abbey of Saint-Léonard-de-Noblat, in Haute-Vienne, in the Limousin region of France. He was converted to Christianity along with the king, at Christmas 496. Leonard became a hermit in the forest of Limousin, where he gathered a number of followers. Leonard or Lienard became one of the most venerated saints of the late Middle Ages. His intercession was credited with miracles for the release of prisoners, women in labour and the diseases of cattle.

Traditional biography

According to the romance that accrued to his name, recorded in an 11th-century vita, Leonard was a Frankish noble in the court of Clovis I, founder of the Merovingian dynasty. Saint Remigius, Bishop of Reims was his godfather. As a disciple of Remigius, he was granted the prerogative to visit prisons and free anyone held there. 

Leonard secured the release of a number of prisoners, for whom he has become a patron saint, then, declining the offer of a bishopric— a prerogative of Merovingian nobles— he entered the monastery at Micy near Orléans, under the direction of Saint Mesmin and Saint Lie. Then, according to his legend, Leonard became a hermit in the forest of Limousin, where he gathered a number of followers. He was active as a preacher throughout Aquitaine. Through his prayers the queen of the Franks safely bore a male child, and in recompense Leonard was given royal lands at Noblac,  from Limoges. It is likely that the toponym was derived from the Latin family name Nobilius and the common Celtic element -ac, simply denoting a place. There he founded the abbey of Noblac, around which a village grew, named in his honour Saint-Léonard-de-Noblat.

According to legend, prisoners who invoked Leonard from their cells saw their chains break before their eyes. Many came to him afterwards, bringing their heavy chains and irons to offer them in homage. A considerable number remained with him, and he often gave them part of his vast forest to clear and make ready for the labours of the fields, that they might have the means to live an honest life.

Diffusion of cult
Although there is no previous mention of Leonard either in literature, liturgy or in church dedications, in the 12th century his cult rapidly spread, at first through Frankish lands, following the release of Bohemond I of Antioch in 1103 from a Danishmend prison, which he atttributed to the intercession of St. Leonard. Bohemond, a charismatic leader of the First Crusade, subsequently visited the Abbey of Noblac, where he made an offering in gratitude for his release. Bishop Walram of Naumburg, who was present during Bohemond's visit, wrote up a new life of Leonard, including posthumous miracles like Bohemond's. Bohemond's example inspired many similar gifts, enabling the construction of the Romanesque church and its prominent landmark belltower. About the same time Noblac was becoming a stage on the pilgrimage route that led to Santiago de Compostela. Leonard's cult spread through all of Western Europe: in England, with its cultural connections to the region, no fewer than 177 churches are dedicated to him. Leonard was venerated in Scotland, England, the Low Countries, Spain, Italy, Switzerland, Germany, particularly in Bavaria, and also in Bohemia, Poland, and elsewhere. Pilgrims and patronage flowed to Saint-Leonard de Noblac.

Leonard or Lienard became one of the most venerated saints of the late Middle Ages. His intercession was credited with miracles for the release of prisoners, women in labour and the diseases of cattle. His feast day is 6 November, when he is honoured with a festival at Bad Tölz, Bavaria. He is honoured by the parish of Kirkop, Malta, on the third Sunday of every August.

Veneration

The growing tide of pilgrims passing on their way to Santiago inspired romances to publicize more than one locally venerated saint along the pilgrim routes. Saint Martial is another example of a saint of the Limousin whose dramatic vita helped attract pilgrims to his shrine.  The village below the shrine of Saint Leonard, perched on its hilltop site, had its origins in the 11th century, when under the jurisdiction of the château of Noblac it was first encircled with walls, a necessity of life in the region. It developed as a small center of commerce in the 13th century, based on forges and foundries (perhaps the origin of the saint's association with chains) and leatherworking, with communal consuls who were in charge of defending its rights and privileges – its "liberties" in the medieval sense. A history of the commune, written by the local antiquary and historian of the Limousin, Louis Guibert in 1890, was reissued in 1992.

In the Alpine regions of Bavaria, St Leonard is regarded as the traditional patron of farmers. Many Bavarian communities carry out traditional processions or rides on his feast day; community members wear traditional costume, usually dirndls for the women and Lederhosen for the men. Until the Secularisation, Inchenhofen became a major pilgrimage site for the cult of St. Leonard, promoted by the Cistercian monks of nearby Fürstenfeld Abbey.

Leonard is remembered in the Church of England with a commemoration on 6 November.

Notable dedications
Various places refer to this saint. Notable among these is the town of St Leonards-on-Sea in East Sussex, England. Sussex is also home to St Leonard's Forest.  This part of England has a significant number of dedications to St Leonard. Some of the best-known are the parish church of St Leonard in Hythe, Kent, with its famous ossuary and St. Leonard%27s, Shoreditch in London. There is a cluster of dedications in the West Midlands region, including the original parish churches of Bridgnorth (now a redundant church and used for community purposes) and Bilston, as well as White Ladies Priory, a ruined Augustinian house. The largest hospital in northern mediaeval England was an Augustinian foundation dedicated to St. Leonard, in York; its partial ruins are to be found in the Museum Gardens although undercroft remains lie some hundred yards away and are used as a bar under the York Theatre Royal. In Newton Abbot, Devon, there is both a chapel of ease dedicated to St Leonard, first recorded in 1350, and a replacement church built in 1834. The chapel was near the bridewell (prison). There is also a church dedicated to St Leonard in Wallingford, Oxfordshire; the church is Saxon in origin but it was heavily rebuilt in 1849 in the Victorian gothic revival style by architect Henry Hakewill. 

Several German churches are dedicated to the saint, including St. Leonhard, Frankfurt.

In Italy almost 225 places are dedicated to the saint, equally distributed in the North (in Friuli, there is the oldest Italian church dedicated to this saint, 774) as well as in the South where the shrine was introduced by the Normans. The shrine can be found even in Italian islands such as Sicily, Sardinia, Ischia, Procida. In September 2004, a national meeting of the Italian parish churches dedicated to the Saint took place in the small village of Panza d'Ischia where a small chapel of St. Leonard was transformed into a church in 1536.

The Mediterranean nation of Malta contains a single parish dedicated to this saint, in the town of Kirkop; the parish church was founded on 29 May 1592. The saint is known as San Anard Abbati in Maltese.

In Portugal the parish and church (late 12th century) of Atouguia da Baleia (Peniche) is dedicated to St Leonard. The saint's day is commemorated every 6 November (or the closest Sunday). This is the only parish dedicated to St Leonard in the country.

Gallery

See also 
 St Leonard's Church (disambiguation)
 Saint Leonard (disambiguation)
 St Leonards (disambiguation)
 Saint Leonard of Noblac, patron saint archive

References

Further reading
Guibert, Louis La commune de Saint-Léonard-de-Noblat au XIIIe siècle. Limoges, 1890 (reprinted 1992)

External links
Saint of the Day, November 6: Leonard of Noblac, Abbot
Life of Leonard
St Leonard's Church, Hythe
St Leonard's Chapel, Newland
Colonnade Statue St Peter's Square

559 deaths
6th-century Frankish saints
Year of birth unknown
Anglican saints
Culture of Altbayern